Bob Oristaglio (April 6, 1924 – February 14, 1995) was an American football defensive end. He played for the Buffalo Bills in 1949, the Baltimore Colts in 1950, the Cleveland Browns in 1951 and for the Philadelphia Eagles in 1952.

References

1924 births
1995 deaths
American football defensive ends
American football ends
Penn Quakers football players
Buffalo Bills players
Baltimore Colts players
Cleveland Browns players
Philadelphia Eagles players
Baltimore Colts (1947–1950) players